The 2008 Scotland rugby union tour of Argentina was a series of matches played in June 2008 in Argentina by the Scotland national team. It consisted of two tests v. the Argentine side, with one win for both teams.

Players 
In May 2008, the Scottish Rugby Union announced the list of players to tour to Argentina:

Backs
Chris Paterson (Gloucester)
Hugo Southwell (Edinburgh Rugby)
Simon Danielli (Ulster)
Thom Evans (Glasgow Warriors)
Ben Cairns (Edinburgh Rugby)
Graeme Morrison (Glasgow Warriors)
Andrew Henderson (Glasgow Warriors)
Nick De Luca (Edinburgh Rugby)
Dan Parks (Glasgow Warriors)
Phil Godman (Edinburgh Rugby)
Rory Lawson (Gloucester)
Mike Blair (Edinburgh Rugby) (capt)

Forwards
Allan Jacobsen (Edinburgh Rugby)
Alasdair Dickinson (Gloucester)
Ross Ford (Edinburgh Rugby)
Dougie Hall (Glasgow Warriors)
Euan Murray (Northampton Saints)
Moray Low (Glasgow Warriors)
Scott MacLeod (Llanelli Scarlets)
Dave Callam (Edinburgh Rugby)
Johnnie Beattie
John Barclay
Kelly Brown (all Glasgow Warriors)
Allister Hogg (Edinburgh Rugby)
Alasdair Strokosch (Gloucester)

Summary 
Complete list of matches played by Scotland in Argentina:

 Test matches

Match details

First test

Second test

References

Scotland
tour
Scotland national rugby union team tours
rugby
Rugby union tours of Argentina